is a 2000 Japanese television drama for Fuji Television, about an art appraiser working at an Auction house in Tokyo while searching for a legendary counterpart to the Mona Lisa, the Mona Lisa of Sorrow.

Premise 
Art expert and auctioneer Masayuki Tachibana (Yōsuke Eguchi) joins the newly established auction house Weisz Tokyo, ostensibly to audit and oversee its operations on behalf of the company's London head office, while secretly pursuing his own agenda – the search for the whereabouts of the real copy of Leonardo da Vinci's Mona Lisa, as well as its legendary counterpart and companion piece, the Mona Lisa of Sorrow.

Cast

Weisz Tokyo Auction House 

 Yōsuke Eguchi as Masayuki Tachibana – art expert and auctioneer, transferring from the Weisz London head office
 Riona Hazuki as Chizuru Orihara – art restorer
 Masatō Ibu as Kaoru Usami – manager of Weisz Tokyo
 Junichi Okada as Takuro Okajima – assistant manager and accountant, formerly a banker from Toto Bank
Yoshizumi Ishihara as Yoshiharu Kamei – Oriental art specialist
Shiro Namiki as Shuhei Miyashita – jewelry specialist
Hajime Okayama as Osamu Motegi – wine specialist
Satoko Oshima as Utako Sakazaki – Western art specialist
Aki Shibuya and Yumie Kobayashi as assistants and announcers

Others 

 Matsumoto Hakuō II as Kiichiro Tsunashima – Chairman of GT Systems (credited as Koshiro Matsumoto)
Yumiko Ishitomi as Kiyoko Onuki – secretary to chairman Tsunashima
Masami Hayashi as Midori Takashiro – art coordinator and one of Usami's regular customers

Episodes

References

External links 

 Official Fuji TV page for Mona Lisa's Smile

Fuji TV dramas
2000 Japanese television series debuts
2000 Japanese television series endings
Japanese-language television shows